Lakshmi College is one of the largest parallel colleges in Kerala, India with more than three thousand students. This college was founded in the 1980s by an enterprising trio of teachers Jose, Davis and Pearson. From its humble beginnings in a rented space on the upper storey of a house in the village of Moothakunnam, the college has expanded and is now situated near the Amman Kovil temple at Paravoor.

Located at the heart of North Paravoor, Lakshmi College offers B.Com., B.Sc.(Mathematics),M.Com.and M.A.(Economics). The students opting for these courses are enrolled with the Mahatma Gandhi University and the Calicut University.

Notable faculties
 Sunil P. Ilayidom

References

Colleges in Kerala
Universities and colleges in Ernakulam district